Tiffany Dupont (born March 22, 1981) is an American actress, known for playing the lead character, Hadassah, a Jewish girl who will become the Biblical Esther, Queen of Persia, in the Hollywood film One Night with the King. From 2007 to 2009, Dupont co-starred on the ABC Family series Greek, where she played Frannie, who was head of the Iota Kappa Iota house which she founded on campus to rival ZBZ.

Life
Dupont grew up in Burke, Virginia, attending high school at Lake Braddock Secondary School. She has stated that she is of half Italian and half Dutch descent; she also has one-eight Surinamese and Guyanese ancestry. While in school, she was active in orchestra, various athletics, as well as high school theatre. She is a graduate of the University of Georgia and also served as Miss University of Georgia during her junior year. While attending the University of Georgia, she was a violinist and original member of The Dave Matthews Cover Band, a nationally touring tribute act.

Dupont has been described as a "committed Christian" and at the time of her appearance as Esther said she only wanted to play wholesome roles.
In September 2021, Dupont announced on her Instagram that she was engaged to her boyfriend of two years, Cristiano Green and that she was  also expecting their first child. In October 2021, she announced the birth of their daughter, Venice Louise via Instagram.

Filmography

Film

Television

Music videos

References

External links

American television actresses
American Protestants
University of Georgia alumni
Living people
1981 births
American film actresses
Actresses from Colorado Springs, Colorado
People from Burke, Virginia
Actresses from Virginia
21st-century American actresses
American people of Italian descent
American people of Dutch descent
American people of Guyanese descent
American people of Surinamese descent